The 2022–23 KNVB Cup, for sponsoring reasons officially called the TOTO KNVB Beker, is the 105th season of the annual Dutch national football cup competition. It began in August with the first of two preliminary rounds, and will conclude in April 2023 with the final played at De Kuip in Rotterdam.

PSV are the defending champions.

Schedule

First preliminary round

Second preliminary round

First round 
In the first round, the 21 winners from the second preliminary round were joined by 4 other amateur clubs, the 16 clubs from the Eerste Divisie and 13 clubs from the Eredivisie. Ajax, AZ, Feyenoord, PSV Eindhoven and Twente automatically advanced to the second round due to their participation in European club competitions.

Second round 
The second round consisted of 32 teams; the 27 winners from the first round as well as the five Eredivisie clubs which automatically advanced to the second round due to their participation in European club competitions. The draw took place on 22 October 2022.

Round of 16 
The round of 16 consists of the 16 winners from the second round. The draw took place on 14 January 2023, with matches being played from 7 to 9 February 2023.

Quarter-finals 
The quarter-finals will consist of the 8 winners from the round of 16. The draw took place on 11 February 2023, with matches being played on 28 February  through 2 March 2023.

Semi-finals 
The semi-finals matches will be played on 4 and 5 April 2023.

Final 
The final is scheduled to be played on 30 April 2023 at De Kuip in Rotterdam. The winners of the semi-final between Feyenoord and Ajax will be designated as the home team.

Top scorers

References 

KNVB Cup seasons
Netherlands
KNVB Cup